South Korea competed at the 1980 Summer Paralympics in Arnhem, Netherlands.

Medalists

Archery

Dartchery

Table tennis

References

 IPC

Nations at the 1980 Summer Paralympics
1980
Paralympics